In gridiron football, a penalty is a sanction assessed against a team for a violation of the rules, called a foul. Officials initially signal penalties by tossing a bright yellow colored penalty flag onto the field toward or at the spot of a foul. 

Many penalties result in moving the football toward the offending team's end zone, usually in 5 yard increments. Penalties may go as high as 25 yards depending on the penalty and league. Most penalties against the defensive team also result in the offense receiving an automatic first down, while a few penalties against the offensive team cause them to automatically lose a down.

In some cases, depending on the spot of the foul, the ball is moved half the distance to the goal line rather than the usual number of yards, or the defense scores an automatic safety.

Rationale
Because football is a high-contact sport requiring a balance between offense and defense, many rules exist that regulate equality, safety, contact, and actions of players on each team. It is very difficult to always avoid violating these rules without giving up too much of an advantage. Thus, an elaborate system of fouls and penalties has been developed to "let the punishment fit the crime" and maintain a balance between following the rules and keeping a good flow of the game. For example, it is in large part because sacking the quarterback typically results in a loss of about ten yards, and because illegal holding is often committed by members of the offense in an effort to prevent the quarterback from being sacked, that the penalty for a holding foul is set at ten yards. 

Players and coaches are constantly looking for ways to find an advantage that stretches the limitations imposed by the rules. For example, in 2016 the Baltimore Ravens had all of their offensive linemen commit holding penalties to allow the punter to keep possession of the ball so time would expire for a win, since the game can end on offensive penalties. However, the NFL changed the rules after this to prevent teams from manipulating the game clock in this way. The frequency and severity of fouls can make a large difference in the outcome of a game as well, so coaches are constantly looking for ways to minimize the number and severity of infractions committed by their players.

Often, the initial result of a play in which a foul is committed is of greater benefit to the non-offending team compared to the benefit of the penalty. For example, if the offense commits a holding foul, it would not be to the advantage of the defense to have the penalty assessed if in spite of the foul they sacked the quarterback for a twelve yard loss, especially considering the offense would have the chance to repeat the down if penalized for holding. Therefore, teams have the option of declining to have penalties assessed - when this occurs, the initial result of the play will stand. It is a common misconception that the term penalty is used to refer both to an infraction and the penal consequence of that infraction. A foul is a rule infraction (e.g. offensive holding) for which a penalty (e.g. move back 10 yards) is either assessed or declined.

Signaling and announcing penalties

History
Penalties were originally signaled using whistles or horns.
In 1943, college coach Dike Beede gave the first penalty flags to a 4-person crew led by Jack McPhee, who found the penalty flags clear and easy to use in noisy environments, which led to their eventual use in professional football in 1948.

Today
Officials initially signal fouls by tossing a bright yellow flag onto the field toward or at the spot of the foul. Until 2021, flags in Canadian football were orange. Because of this, broadcasters and fans often use the terms "flag", "flag on the play", or "flag is down" to refer to fouls during the game.

During a play, multiple officials may flag the same foul, and multiple flags may be thrown for separate fouls on the same play. If applicable, the same official can signal additional fouls on a given play by throwing a beanbag or their cap. When officials throw a flag during a down, play does not stop until the ball becomes dead under normal conditions, as if there were no fouls.

Once the ball is dead, or immediately when a foul is called after a play is over or prior to a snap (since the ball is dead anyway), the referee, the officials who threw the flags and other officials with a view of the play confer on whether the initially "alleged" infraction is adjudged (after deliberation and consideration of the rule(s) and the infraction) to have actually been committed, what it was, and who committed it. The final determination and assessment of the penalty is the sole responsibility of the referee. The referee then makes initial body signals to the press box indicating what fouls were committed and the team that committed them, the latter shown by extending the arm toward that team's end zone.

The referee then confers with the offended team's on-field captain to find out whether the offended team would rather decline the penalty and take the result of the play. The result of the play may be more advantageous to the offended team, especially, for example, if time is running out in the half and a 7-yard gain is a better option than a 5-yard penalty. However, the referee may not have to confer with the team captain because the choice is fairly obvious (such as when the defense commits a foul during a play in which the offense scores a touchdown). After any final conference, the referee then makes full visual signals describing the foul in detail, consisting of: the foul that was committed, the team that committed it, whether or not the opposing team chooses to decline it, the resulting down or possession, and any other penalties such as disqualification (ejection) of a player from the game or a ten-second runoff from the game clock. In college football, the NFL and other professional leagues, and in some high school games, the referee also announces the fouls and their penalties over the stadium's public address system using a wireless microphone. In college and professional football, and high school in some states, the referee will also give out the jersey numbers of the player(s) who committed the fouls (on rare occasions, the player's position is announced in lieu of the jersey number). During these announcements, the referee usually does not use names of the respective teams or their cities (however, in the Canadian Football League (CFL), they are announced by their respective city or province), but rather will use the generic terms "offense", "defense", "kicking team", "receiving team", etc. Some officials, especially in high school and lower levels, will refer to teams by their jersey color (e.g. "white", "red", "blue", etc.).

The typical announcement follows this format: [foul], [team], [number(s) of the player(s) committing the foul], [distance], [next down: replay of down, loss of down, etc.].

NFL example: "Holding, defense number 52. Five-yard penalty, automatic first down." (Holding on defense gives an automatic first down for the offense.)

High school example: "Pass interference, defense. Half the distance to the goal line, repeat third down." (Defensive pass interference is not an automatic first down.)

CFL example: "Pass interference, Ottawa number 13. Ball will be placed at the spot of the foul, automatic first down."

General types of penalty enforcement
The following are general types of penalty enforcement. Specific rules will vary depending on the league, conference, and/or level of football.

Most penalties result in replaying the down and moving the ball toward the offending team's end zone. The distance is usually either 5, 10, or 15 yards depending on the penalty. However, such penalties, when enforced, are capped at half the distance to the offending team's goal line.

Depending on the foul, the spot where the penalty is enforced may be at the spot of the foul; the previous spot (the line of scrimmage where the down began); the spot of the snap, fumble or backwards pass; or the succeeding spot (the line of scrimmage of the next down).

Some defensive penalties give the offense an automatic first down. Conversely, some offensive penalties result in loss of a down (loss of the right to repeat the down). The offensive team receives a first down if a penalty by the defense awards them enough yardage to attain it.

Rules are asymmetrical in regard to whether a team can score directly as a result of a penalty. The offensive team typically cannot do so; if a foul that is penalized from the spot of the foul is called on the defense in its own end zone, the ball is placed on either the one-yard line or the two-yard line, and the offense must try to score from there. Exceptions (which are extremely rare at higher levels) can apply for egregious conduct known as palpably unfair acts e.g. someone entering the field to interfere with a player running towards the end zone with the ball. On the other hand, penalties called on the offense in its own end zone can result in the defense scoring a two-point safety.

If a team commits a foul during the last play of any quarter, the other team has the option to accept the penalty and extend the quarter one more play even with the clock showing 00:00 (i.e., an untimed play).

In American football, when multiple fouls occur, when both teams commit a foul during a play, regardless of severity, the fouls are usually offset and the down is replayed. However, the fouls must be committed in the same time frame. For instance, two fouls during the active play can offset, but a foul during the play and a personal foul after the whistle may not. Two personal fouls after the play can offset, although this is not often called. In the NFL, a major (15-yard) penalty by one team may not offset a minor (5-yard) penalty by the other team. In the CFL, the penalty yardage is generally netted: a 15-yard penalty by one team and a 10-yard penalty by the other will result in 5 net yards of penalty enforcement.

The most serious fouls (for example, fighting or deliberately making contact with an official) will result in disqualification (i.e. the ejection of the player from the game) while some slightly less serious fouls (for example, unsportsmanlike conduct) can result in disqualification if committed by the same player or coach a certain number of times. Upon disqualification, the ejected player(s) must immediately leave the field of play including the bench area - typically, at any competitive level, a disqualified player is expected to return to his team's dressing room. Some fouls can lead to supplemental discipline after the game. At the professional level, even personal fouls not serious enough to warrant disqualification (including any not seen by the officials) will often result in fines. Particular attention in this regard is now taken with respect to blows to the head, due to the now-known long-term hazards concussions pose to players' health. A foul serious enough to warrant disqualification may result in a suspension for one or more games. This is especially true for fouls committed after the end of the game, since the usual penalties cannot be enforced then, or close to the end of the game especially if the winner is no longer in doubt.

Unlike in some sports, except when they are disqualified players who commit fouls are not required to leave the field and may take part in the next play, other than in rare cases such as equipment violations where the player must return to the bench and remain there until the violation is corrected. Also, unlike in most other codes of football, there is no circumstance in which a gridiron team can be compelled to play with less than the regulation number of players on the field (eleven in American football and twelve in Canadian football) for any amount of time due to foul play. Even in the case of ejection(s), the disqualified player(s) may immediately be replaced for the next play.

Intentional fouls
In certain situations, a team (specifically in the NFL) may intentionally commit a foul to receive a penalty that they see as advantageous. In general, the NFL—and other sanctioning bodies—do not permit intentional fouling in most circumstances and have taken efforts to close loopholes and negate any advantage that may have come from such a foul.
 Defensive pass interference may be committed in or near the end zone toward the end of a game to prevent a touchdown. This would place the ball at or near the goal line with a first down. The unfair act clause allows for a touchdown to be awarded in such situations and is explicitly recommended when such fouls are repeated.
 Since a penalty will stop the clock, a team may commit a foul late in a game to stop the clock, particularly if they have no timeouts remaining. Some leagues have instituted a 10-second runoff to offset any advantage gained from this. (See below)
 Deliberately injuring a dominant player to prevent them from playing. Even if the offending player is ejected from the game, fined or otherwise punished, if the offending player is of lower caliber than the player who was attacked, the opposing team will be irreparably harmed. The New Orleans Saints allegedly used this tactic on its way to winning Super Bowl XLIV, which was never revoked.
 In the waning minutes of a game, committing a foul such as holding results in the down being replayed, and while the clock stops after the play, the time that elapsed during the play still came off the clock, thus allowing teams to gain extra downs to run out the clock by fouling. The NFL closed this loophole in 2017, declaring this strategy to be unsportsmanlike conduct and resetting the clock to where it stood before the play.

There is one situation in which intentional fouling is generally tolerated: in the event that a team is on its fourth down and within the four-down territory—outside of field goal range but unlikely to gain meaningful yardage for a punt—the offense may take a five-yard dead ball foul such as delay of game or false start to back the offense up five yards and give the punter more space to land a punt within the red zone.

The ten-second runoff rule
In the NFL and NCAA, a 10-second runoff is assessed if any of the following acts are committed in the last minute of either half/overtime (as of 2017, after the two-minute warning in the NFL):
 A foul by either team that prevents the ball from being snapped
 Intentional grounding
 Illegal forward pass beyond the line of scrimmage
 Throwing a backwards pass out of bounds
 Any other intentional act by the offense that causes the clock to stop

The 10-second penalty does not apply if:
 The clock is stopped when the ball is set for play and will not start until the ball is snapped.
 If the team committing the foul has timeouts and elects to use one in lieu of the runoff.
 If the offended team declines the runoff (which prevents the offense from committing fouls to intentionally run out the clock). They may elect to decline the runoff while accepting the yardage penalty but may not do the reverse.

Moreover, the game clock will run once the ball is placed. If such a runoff occurs with 10 seconds or less remaining, the half/overtime automatically ends. Since the enforcement of the 10-second runoff, eight regular season NFL games have had a half end automatically due to this rule. Notable examples include: 2012 New EnglandArizona game in which New England could not attempt a field goal near the end of the first half in a game they lost by two points; a 2014 St. LouisTampa Bay game in which Tampa Bay lost a chance to attempt a game-winning field goal; a 2015 New EnglandNew York Jets game in which New York lost an attempt to throw a Hail Mary pass to tie or win the game; and a 2017 AtlantaDetroit game in which Detroit lost the opportunity to score a game-winning touchdown. A pre-season game in 2006 between Houston and Kansas City had the first half end automatically due to an intentional grounding foul with less than 10 seconds left. A 2013 divisional playoff game between the New Orleans Saints and the Seattle Seahawks also ended on a 10-second runoff after Saints wide receiver Marques Colston threw an illegal forward pass.

Starting in 2011, the NCAA adopted a similar 10-second penalty rule for college football. Like the NFL rule, it applies in the last minute of each half, but the NCAA rule differs in that it applies to fouls by either side that cause a clock stoppage. Like the NFL rule, the team that benefits from the penalty may elect to take both the yardage and the runoff, the yardage alone, or neither (but not the runoff in lieu of yards). The penalized team may elect to take a charged timeout in order to avoid the runoff.

The NCAA rule was passed in response to the end of the 4th quarter in the 2010 Music City Bowl. In that game, the North Carolina Tar Heels were down 20–17 at the end of the 4th quarter, and because they had no timeouts, they spiked the ball to stop the clock with 1 second left while too many men were on the field due to confusion about whether the field goal unit needed to come on the field. Because college football did not yet have the 10-second runoff, UNC was penalized 5 yards but was still able to kick the field goal to send the game to overtime, since the foul caused the clock to stop with time remaining. UNC won the game.

In both the NFL and NCAA, a 10-second runoff is assessed if the game is stopped in the final two minutes of either half/overtime for an instant replay review, and the review determines the clock would not have stopped otherwise. This provision was used near the end of regulation in the 2018 LSU vs. Texas A&M game. An interception by LSU's Grant Delpit was overruled when it was determined Texas A&M quarterback Kellen Mond retrieved a bad snap with his right knee on the ground, ending the play. After the ball was re-spotted and the clock reset, 10 seconds were deducted and the clock restarted on the ready-for-play signal.  In this situation, either team may call a time-out to prevent the runoff.

List of penalties

In the NFL, most defensive penalties result in an automatic first down. The exceptions are offside, encroachment, neutral zone infraction, delay of game, illegal substitution, calling excess timeouts, running into a kicker, and having more than 11 men on the field. In these cases, the appropriate yardage penalty is assessed. If the yardage penalty results in a first down, then a new set of downs is awarded; otherwise, there is a repeat of down.

See also
 1941 Oklahoma City vs. Youngstown football game, first use of the penalty flag

References
Notes

Gridiron football rules
American football terminology

de:Strafe (American Football)